Finding Mr. Destiny (lit. Finding Kim Jong-wook) is a 2010 South Korean romantic comedy starring Im Soo-jung and Gong Yoo. It is a film adaptation by playwright-turned-director Jang Yoo-jeong of her hit 2006 musical.   The film was a medium box office hit in South Korea selling 1,113,285 tickets nationwide.

Plot
Ji-woo (Im Soo-jung), unable to forget a youthful affair in India that has tattooed itself onto her heart, rejects an eligible suitor and is forced by her father, who fears she will end up an old maid, to seek the help of an agency that specializes in tracking down first loves. She only knows his name: Kim Jong-wook.

Heading the business is Gi-joon (Gong Yoo), who is young, single and male, and equipped with goofy charm. Stubbornly precise by nature and a bit too passionate about work, Gi-joon is determined to complete his first job, even if it means he has to track down every Kim Jong-wook in Korea!

The heroine is a disheveled and foulmouthed theater director who has yet to make amends with her inability to finish or start anything substantial in both her love life and career. The hero is a naive guy with an obsessive compulsive fixation on order, safety and hygiene — manifested in his perfectly pressed attire and color-coded post-its — who has yet to leap into a whirlwind life experience.

The two are polar opposites yet eventually grow fond of each other as they bicker along the way to find Ji-woo's elusive Mr. Destiny — and it's a long journey since there are 1,108 men who have the same name as her ex-boyfriend, from a Buddhist monk to an overweight farmer and a really unctuous plastic surgeon, to name a few.

As Gi-joon and Ji-woo travel around the country trying to find her first love, Gi-joon finds himself falling for his client instead.

At the end, we see that Ji-woo and Gi-joon actually first met at Osaka Airport back in 2000.

Cast

 Im Soo-jung ... Seo Ji-woo
 Gong Yoo ... Han Gi-joon
 Chun Ho-jin ... Colonel Seo (Ji-woo's father)
 Ryu Seung-soo ... Gi-joon's brother-in-law
 Jeon Soo-kyung ... Soo-kyung (musical actress)
 Lee Chung-ah ... Ji-hye (Ji-woo's sister)
 Yoon Sa-bong as Ms. Jung
 Lee Je-hoon ... Woo-hyung
 Kim Min-ji ... Cherry
 Jung Gyoo-soo ... Chief of travel agency
 Lee Joon-ha ... Woo-ri (Gi-joon's niece)
 Lee Ji-ha as Customer
 Jo Han-cheol ... Director

Cameo appearance

 Jang Young-nam ... Gi-joon's older sister 
 Shin Sung-rok ... Captain Choi (Ji-woo's pilot boyfriend) 
 Jung Sung-hwa ... Bus driver 
 Oh Na-ra ... Hyo-jeong 
 Choi Il-hwa ... Customer 
 Kim Mu-yeol ... Airline worker 
 Choi Ji-ho ... Kim Jong-wook the soccer player
 Won Ki-joon ... Kim Jong-wook the doctor 
 Jung Joon-ha ... Kim Jong-wook the farmer
 Oh Man-seok ... Kim Jong-mook 
 Kim Dong-wook ... Doctor Jung (Ji-hye's boyfriend)
 Um Ki-joon ... Kim Jong-wook 
 Paul Stafford ... Tourist 
 Park Hoon ... Detective

References

External links
 https://web.archive.org/web/20110519184541/http://www.firstlove2010.co.kr/ 
 
 
 

South Korean romantic comedy films
2010 films
2010 romantic comedy films
2010s Korean-language films
2010s musical films
CJ Entertainment films
2010s South Korean films